Mawk'a Tampu (Quechua mawk'a old, tampu inn, "old tampu", hispanicized spelling Maucatambo) is a mountain in the Andes of Bolivia. It lies in the Potosí Department at the border of the provinces Tomás Frías and Cornelio Saavedra. Mawk'a Tampu is situated in the Khari Khari mountain range east of Potosí. It lies east of the Khari Khari and the Kimsa Kunturiri group and southeast of the Jatun Tiyu Lakes.

References 

Mountains of Potosí Department